Wendling is a village and civil parish in the English county of Norfolk.
For the purposes of local government, it falls within the district of Breckland.

The villages name possibly means 'W(a)endel's people' or perhaps, 'Wennel's place'. The exact form of the personal name is not clear.

The pioneering photographer Robert Howlett, famous for his iconic portrait of the engineer Isambard Kingdom Brunel, is buried in the churchyard of St Peter and St Paul.

Notes

External links

Villages in Norfolk
Civil parishes in Norfolk
Breckland District